Baracus vittatus, the hedge-hopper, is a butterfly belonging to the family Hesperiidae. It is found in India and Sri Lanka.

Description
In 1891, Edward Yerbury Watson described this butterfly as:

Subspecies
B. v. vittatus (Felder, 1862) Sri Lanka
B. v. subditus Moore, [1884] south India
B. v. septentrionum Wood-Mason & de Nicéville, [1887] Sikkim to northeast India
B. v. hampsoni Elwes & Edwards, 1897 (Hampson's hedge hopper) south India
B. v. gotha  Evans, 1949 Tamil Nadu

Life history
The larvae feed on Gramineae.

See also
Papilionidae
List of butterflies of India
List of butterflies of India (Hesperiidae)

References

Hesperiinae
Butterflies of Asia